The Amateur First Division comprises a number of football leagues that make up the seventh tier of the Turkish football league system. Each province has its own league.

See also
Süper Lig
TFF First League
TFF Second League
TFF Third League
Turkish Regional Amateur League
Turkish Cup (since 1962–63)

References

6
Turk